The Metropolitan School District of North Posey County, Indiana, commonly known as the MSD of North Posey, is the school corporation serving northern Posey County, Indiana.  The school district covers six townships in northern Posey County which are Bethel, Center, Harmony, Robb, Robinson and Smith.  The school district also includes the towns of Poseyville, New Harmony, Cynthiana and Griffin.  Unincorporated communities in the district include Wadesville, Stewartsville, St. Wendel, Blairsville and Parker's Settlement.

History
Representatives from Robb School Township, Smith School Township and Center-Robinson Consolidated Schools first met in Poseyville on July 28, 1956, and agreed to reorganize their districts into a single metropolitan school district.  It was also agreed than Bethel School Township would be allowed to join the new school district any time they decided to do so.  The Metropolitan School District of North Posey County was formally created and named at a meeting in Wadesville on November 2, 1956.  Other names suggested at the meeting for the new district were "Quintet" and "North Central".  Bethel School Township joined the new metropolitan school district on February 25, 1957.  On January 19, 2012, it was announced that the Consolidated School Town of New Harmony and Harmony Township would be annexed by the MSD of North Posey County effective July 1, 2012.

Facilities
North Posey Senior High School
North Posey Junior High School
North Elementary School
South Terrace Elementary School
 Southern Indiana Career & Technical Center

Neighboring districts
 Metropolitan School District of Mt. Vernon
 South Gibson School Corporation
 Evansville Vanderburgh School Corporation

References

External links
MSD of North Posey County

Education in Posey County, Indiana
North Posey
1957 establishments in Indiana
School districts established in 1957